"Never Again" is the fourth single by R&B singer Danny Fernandes. It is also the sixth track on the album Intro.

Chart performance
The song debuted at number 95 on the Canadian Hot 100 on the week of June 18, 2009 and peaked at number 44 six weeks later. It would stay on the chart for a total of fifteen weeks.

Music video
The music video was directed by RT! and was shot in Prague, Czech Republic.

References

External links

2008 songs
2009 singles
CP Music Group singles
Danny Fernandes songs
Songs written by Belly (rapper)
Songs written by Danny Fernandes